Ajil (est. pop. (2000 census): 1,842) is a small town in the Penghulu Diman commune in Hulu Terengganu District of Terengganu, Malaysia.

Location
The town is located 35 km south of Kuala Terengganu, the state capital, near the intersection of Federal Route 14 (Terengganu's main interior highway) and Federal Route 106 (the main highway to Kuala Berang). Ajil is also home to a migrant detention centre where illegal immigrants are detained.

References

Hulu Terengganu District
Towns in Terengganu